Glebovo is a rural locality (a village) in Klyazminskoye Rural Settlement, Kovrovsky District, Vladimir Oblast, Russia. The population was 381 as of 2010. There are 6 streets.

Geography 
Glebovo is located on the Klyazma River, 13 km northeast of Kovrov (the district's administrative centre) by road. Golyshevo is the nearest rural locality.

References 

Rural localities in Kovrovsky District